Tirilazad is a drug that has been proposed to treat acute ischaemic stroke. When tested on animal models, tirilazad protects brain tissue, and reduces brain damage. However, the drug fails to treat, and even worsens a stroke when studied on a human being.

Usage in treatment of stroke 
Tirilazad currently has no usage in the clinical treatment of stroke.

References 

Piperazines
Pregnanes
Aminopyrimidines
Pyrrolidines